Georges Victor Liévin Mathieu Mys (26 March 1880 – 7 November 1952) was a rower who competed in the 1908 Summer Olympics for Belgium. He competed as part of the Royal Club Nautique de Gand which won the silver medal in the men's eight.

References

1880 births
1952 deaths
Belgian male rowers
Olympic rowers of Belgium
Olympic silver medalists for Belgium
Rowers at the 1908 Summer Olympics
Olympic medalists in rowing
Medalists at the 1908 Summer Olympics
Royal Club Nautique de Gand rowers
European Rowing Championships medalists
20th-century Belgian people